"Isn't That Everything" is song co-written and recorded by American country music artist Danielle Peck.  It was released in October 2006 as the third single from the album Danielle Peck.  The song reached #30 on the Billboard Hot Country Songs chart.  The song was written by Peck, Blair Daly and Tommy Lee James.

Chart performance

References

2006 singles
2006 songs
Danielle Peck songs
Songs written by Blair Daly
Songs written by Tommy Lee James
Big Machine Records singles